Brunswick Square is a single story shopping mall located in East Brunswick, New Jersey, at the intersection of Route 18 and Rues Lane. The current anchor stores are JCPenney and Macy's.

History
Brunswick Square Mall was built on land that was formerly the Ostroski Farm on Rues Land. The Ostroski family sold the land to the Macy's Corporation in 1969 for the construction of Bamberger's. The mall, originally owned by DeBartolo Corporation, opened in 1970 with anchors JCPenney and Bamberger's. Bamberger's became Macy's in 1986 when the chain was phased out in favor of the Macy's name.

In 1999, a smaller expansion took place that added a Barnes & Noble and expanded the movie theater to 13 stadium seating screens. The theater expansion occupied an adjacent McCrory's. Several eateries were incorporated into the movie theater, including Nathan's Famous, Ben & Jerry's, and Auntie Anne's, to make up for a lack of a proper food court. Also that year, Simon Property Group acquired the mall from DeBartolo.

In October 2000, the interior of the mall was renovated in which new ceilings, skylights, flooring and lighting was installed and a second main entrance was constructed on the west side of the mall through a space formerly occupied by Kinney Shoes, next to Spencer's Gifts. In 2011, JCPenney underwent major renovations to give the store a new look and add a Sephora inside the department store.

Numerous stores have come and gone since 2011. The movie theater Mega Movies closed down and was replaced by Starplex Cinemas in 2011. Starplex had also bought the fast food franchise licenses of the Nathan's Famous and Ben & Jerry's from Mega Movies but subsequently decided to close the ice cream store due to a lack of revenue. In early 2013, construction was completed on a new entrance and hallway anchored with a Panera Bread, Tilted Kilt, and GoWireless. In 2015, Starplex Cinemas was bought out by AMC Theatres. Also in 2015, the Subway sandwich store closed and was replaced by the Pop in Cafe. The Pop In Cafe has since closed.

In 2016, Simon Property Group sold the mall to WP Glimcher. Also that year, Ruby Tuesday closed to make way for Bar Louie and Red Robin. Bar Louie opened in late-2016 and Red Robin opened in August 2017. In addition, Rainbow moved next to Famous Footwear during this time and its former storefront was used for Red Robin.

Pups of War, a nerf blaster arena, opened in June 2021.

Gallery

References

External links
Brunswick Square
International Council of Shopping Centers: Brunswick Square

Buildings and structures in Middlesex County, New Jersey
Shopping malls in New Jersey
Shopping malls established in 1970
East Brunswick, New Jersey
Tourist attractions in Middlesex County, New Jersey
Shopping malls in the New York metropolitan area